St. Mary's Monastery Church is a monastery church in Koshovicë, Gjirokastër County, Albania. It is a Cultural Monument of Albania.

References

Cultural Monuments of Albania
Buildings and structures in Dropull
Churches in Albania